Andrew Zolile T. Brook (22 November 1929 – 5 September 2011) was the Catholic bishop of the Diocese of Umtata, South Africa. Ordained to the priesthood in 1957, Brook was appointed bishop of the Umtala Diocese in 1979 resigning in 1995.

Notes

1929 births
2011 deaths
20th-century Roman Catholic bishops in South Africa
Place of birth missing
Place of death missing
Roman Catholic bishops of Umtata